Olin Township is a non-functioning administrative division of Iredell County, North Carolina, United States. By the requirements of the North Carolina Constitution of 1868, the counties were divided into townships, which included Olin township.

Geography
Olin township is bounded by Union Grove township on the north, Sharpesburg township on the west, Bethany and Cool Springs townships on the south, and Turnersburg township on the east.  The South Yadkin River flows on the border of Olin township on the south and east.

Interstate 77 runs north–south through Olin township.

History

The following are or have been located in Olin township:
 Charles Post Office (1899-1951) 
 Ebenezer Academy (1823-1900)
 Fairmont Church
 Friendship Church
 Gethsemane Baptist Church
 Hebron Baptist Church
 Moss Chapel Methodist Church and Cemetery, founded in about 1800
 Mount Sinai Church
 Mount Vernon Baptist Church and Cemetery, founded in 1836
 New Institute (1852-1856)
 North Iredell High School
 Olin unincorporated community
 Olin United Methodist Church and Cemetery, founded in 1851
 Refuge Church
 Siloan Church
 Turnersburg, town (1858–present)

References

Townships in Iredell County, North Carolina
Townships in North Carolina
1868 establishments in North Carolina